Kambut, sometimes is known as Gambut, is a village in eastern Libya, some  east of Tobruk. It is a site of an old military airfield in World War II.

Notes

Populated places in Butnan District